The Marsh Motorcycle Company is a veteran era American motorcycle maker founded in  Brockton, Massachusetts.

The company was formed by the Marsh brothers in Brockton in 1899. In 1905, it was combined with  Charles Metz's Metz Motorcycle Company to create the American Motorcycle Company.

The Marsh brothers also created the Marsh Motor Carriage Company in 1899. Steam and gasoline runabouts were built on a limited basis.

References

Sources 
 Mirco de Cet: Illustrated Directory of Motorcycles, Motorbooks International (Dec., 2002),   (soft cover)

Brass Era vehicles
Brockton, Massachusetts
Defunct motor vehicle manufacturers of the United States
Defunct manufacturing companies based in Massachusetts